Mapmaker is the third album from Parts & Labor, released in 2007 on Jagjaguwar Records.

Track listing
"Fractured Skies"
"Brighter Days"
"Vision of Repair"
"The Gold We're Digging"
"New Crimes"
"Long Way Down"
"Ghosts Will Burn"
"Unexplosions"
"Camera Shy"
"King of the Hill" (Minutemen cover)
"Fake Rain"
"Knives and Pencils"

References

2007 albums
Parts & Labor albums
Jagjaguwar albums